Minuscule 855 (in the Gregory-Aland numbering), Θε27 (von Soden), is a 12th-century Greek minuscule manuscript of the New Testament on parchment. The manuscript has complex content.

Description 

The codex contains the text of the four Gospels on 584 parchment leaves (size ). The text is written in one column per page, 36 lines per page.
It is ornamented.

It contains a commentary of Theophylact's authorship and pictures.

Text 

Kurt Aland did not place the Greek text of the codex in any Category.

It was not examined by the Claremont Profile Method.

History 

F. H. A. Scrivener and C. R. Gregory dated the manuscript to the 12th century. Currently the manuscript is dated by the INTF to the 12th century.

The manuscript was added to the list of New Testament manuscripts by Scrivener (668e) and Gregory (855e). Gregory saw it in 1886.

Currently the manuscript is housed at the Vatican Library (Gr. 643), in Rome.

See also 

 List of New Testament minuscules
 Biblical manuscript
 Textual criticism
 Minuscule 854

References

Further reading

External links 
 

Greek New Testament minuscules
12th-century biblical manuscripts
Manuscripts of the Vatican Library